Bad Homburg Gonzenheim is a station on line U2 of the Frankfurt U-Bahn. It is located in the Gonzenheim district of Bad Homburg vor der Höhe, in Hesse, Germany.

References

External links 

Frankfurt U-Bahn stations
Railway stations in Germany opened in 1971
1971 in West Germany
Hochtaunuskreis